Coleophora asteris is a moth of the family Coleophoridae found in North Africa and Europe.

Description
The wingspan is 10–15 mm. Adults have brownish buff forewing with white along the veins, and a scatter of blackish scales on both the white and buff areas. They are on wing from June to September.

The larvae feed on the seeds of European Michaelmas-daisy (Aster amellus) and sea aster (Tripolium vulgare). They create a brown silken cigar-shaped case with slight wrinkling about 6 mm in length. Larvae can be found in September and October. They overwinter in debris until pupation which takes place in the case, in June.

Subspecies
Coleophora asteris asteris
Coleophora asteris abbreviata Falkovitsh, 1993 (eastern Siberia)

Distribution
Coleophora asteris has been found from Ireland to Germany, Austria and Romania and from Norway and Sweden to France, Italy and Hungary. It has also been recorded from Crete and North Africa.

References

asteris
Moths described in 1864
Moths of Africa
Moths of Europe
Taxa named by Johann Gottfried Gottlieb Muhlig